Dogs have a wide range of coat colors, patterns, textures and lengths. Dog coat color is governed by how genes are passed from dogs to their puppies and how those genes are expressed in each dog. Dogs have about 19,000 genes in their genome but only a handful affect the physical variations in their coats. Most genes come in pairs, one being from the dog’s mother and one being from its father. Genes of interest have more than one expression (or version) of an allele. Usually only one, or a small number of alleles exist for each gene. In any one gene locus a dog will either be homozygous where the gene is made of two identical alleles (one from its mother and one its father) or heterozygous where the gene is made of two different alleles (one inherited from each parent).

To understand why a dog’s coat looks the way it does based on its genes requires an understanding of a handful of  genes and their alleles which affect the dog's coat. For example, to find how a black and white greyhound that seems to have wavy hair got its coat, the dominant black gene with its K and k alleles, the (white) spotting gene with its multiple alleles, and the R and r alleles of the curl gene, would be looked at.

Genes associated with coat color

Each hair follicle is surrounded by many melanocytes (pigment cells), which make and transfer the pigment melanin into a developing hair. Dog fur is colored by two types of melanin: eumelanin (brownish-black) and phaeomelanin (reddish-yellow). A melanocyte can be signaled to produce either color of melanin.

Dog coat colors are from patterns of:
 Eumelanin — black, chocolate brown, grey or taupe pigment;
 Phaeomelanin — tan pigment, including all shades of red, gold and cream pigment; and/or
 Lack of melanin — white (no pigment).

By 2020, more than eight genes in the canine genome have been verified to determine coat color. Each of these has at least two known alleles. Together these genes account for the variation in coat color seen in dogs. Each gene has a unique, fixed location, known as a locus, within the dog genome.

Some of the loci associated with canine coat color are:

Pigment shade 
Several loci can be grouped as affecting the shade of color: the Brown (B), Dilution (D), and Intensity (I) loci.

B (brown) locus

The gene at the B locus is known as tyrosinase related protein 1 (TYRP1). This gene affects the color of the eumelanin pigment produced, making it either black or brown. TYRP1 is an enzyme involved in the synthesis of eumelanin.  Each of the known mutations appears to eliminate or significantly reduce TYRP1 enzymatic activity. This modifies the shape of the final eumelanin molecule, changing the pigment from a black to a brown color. Color is affected in coat and skin (including the nose and paw pads).

There are four known alleles that occur at the B locus:
B = Black eumelanin. An animal that has at least one copy of the B allele will have a black nose, paw pads and eye rims and (usually) dark brown eyes.
b = Brown eumelanin - such as chocolate or liver (includes several alleles - bs, bd and bc). An animal with any matched or unmatched pair of the b alleles will have brown, rather than black, hair, a liver nose, paw pads and eye rims, and hazel eyes. Phaeomelanin color is unaffected. Only one of the alleles is present in the English Setter (bs), Doberman Pinscher (bd) and Italian Greyhound (bc), but in most breeds with any brown allele two or all three are present. It is unknown whether the different brown alleles cause specific shades or hues of brown.

B is dominant to b.

D (dilute) locus
The melanophilin gene (MLPH) at the D locus causes a dilution mainly of eumelanin, while phaeomelanin is less affected. This dilution gene determines the intensity of pigmentation. MLPH codes for a protein involved in the distribution of melanin - it is part of the melanosome transport complex. Defective MLPH prevents normal pigment distribution, resulting in a paler colored coat.

There are two common alleles: D (normal, wild-type MLPH), and d (defective MLPH) that occur in many breeds.  But recently the research group of Tosso Leeb has identified additional alleles in other breeds.

D = Not diluted. Black or brown eumelanin (as determined by Brown locus), reddish or orangish tan phaeomelanin.
d = Diluted. Diluted fur color: black eumelanin (B/-) diluted to bluish grey (ranging from light blue-grey to dark steel); brown eumelanin (b/b) diluted to taupe or "Isabella". Phaeomelanin is diluted from red to yellowish tan; this phaeomelanin dilution is not as dramatic as the eumelanin color shift. Slight to moderate dilution of the paw pads and eye rims towards bluish grey if B/- or taupe if b/b, and slight to moderate reduction of eye color from brown towards amber in a B/- animal, or from hazel towards light amber in a b/b animal.

D is completely dominant to d.

This dilution gene can occur in almost any breed, where blue gene is the most common. Also, there are some breeds that come in dilute but with no specific color, such as the Weimaraner or the Slovakian Pointer. Some breeds that are commonly known to have dilution genes are "Italian greyhounds, whippets, Tibetan mastiffs, greyhounds, Staffordshire bull terriers, and Neapolitan mastiffs".

Color gene interactions

I (intensity) locus
The alleles responsible for pheomelanin dilution (changing of a dog's coat from tan to cream or white) was found to be the result of a mutation in MFSD12 in 2019. and occurs in breeds that do not exhibit dark gold or red phenotypes.

Two alleles are theorised to occur at the I locus:
 I = Non-diluted pigment
 i = Diluted pigment

It's been observed that I and i interact with semi-dominance, so that there are three distinct phenotypes. I/i heterozygotes are paler than I/I animals but normally darker than i/i animals.
 i results in diluted phaeomelanin such as cream, yellow, and white. Unlike d/d, it allows the skin and eyes to remain dark.

It does not effect eumelanin (black/brown/blue/lilac) pigment, i.e. leaving a cream Afghan with a very black mask.

This is not to be confused with the cream or white in Nordic Breeds such as the Siberian Husky, or cream roan in the Australian Cattle Dog, whose cream and white coats are controlled by genes in the Extension E Locus.

Red Pigment

Pigment Intensity for dogs who are darker than Tan (shades of gold to red) has been attributed to a mutation upstream of KITLG, in the same genes responsible for coat color in mice and hair color in humans.

The mutation is the result of a Copy Number Variant, or duplication of certain instructions within a gene, that controls the distribution of pigment in a dog's hair follicle. As such, there are no genetic markers for red pigment.

 Dogs with a higher CNV were observed to have darker, richer colors such as deep gold, red, and chestnut. 
 Dogs with a lower CNV were observed to have lighter gold and orange colors.

This mutation not only effects Pheomelanin, but Eumelanin as well. This mutation does not effect all breeds the same.

Pigment type 

Several loci can be grouped as controlling when and where on a dog eumelanin (blacks-browns) or phaeomelanin (reds-yellows) are produced: the Agouti (A), Extension (E) and Black (K) loci. Intercellular signaling pathways tell a melanocyte which type of melanin to produce. Time-dependent pigment switching can lead to the production of a single hair with bands of eumelanin and phaeomelanin. Spatial-dependent signaling results in parts of the body with different levels of each pigment.

MC1R (the E locus) is a receptor on the surface of melanocytes. When active, it causes the melanocyte to synthesize eumelanin; when inactive, the melanocyte produces phaeomelanin instead. ASIP (the A locus) binds to and inactivates MC1R, thereby causing phaeomelanin synthesis. DEFB103 (the K locus) in turn prevents ASIP from inhibiting MC1R, thereby increasing eumelanin synthesis.

A (agouti) locus 

The alleles at the A locus are related to the production of agouti signalling protein (ASIP) and determine whether an animal expresses an agouti appearance, and, by controlling the distribution of pigment in individual hairs, what type of agouti. There are four known alleles that occur at the A locus:
 Ay = Fawn or sable. Tan with black whiskers and varying amounts of black-tipped and/or all-black hairs dispersed throughout. Fawn typically referring to dogs with clearer tan and sable to those with more black shading.
 aw = Wild-type agouti. Each hair with 3-6 bands alternating black and tan. Also called wolf sable.
 at = Tan point. Black with tan patches on the face and underside - including saddle tan (tan with a black saddle or blanket). Phaeomelanin production is limited to tan points; dark portions of the dog are solid eumelanin hairs.
 a = Recessive black. Solid black, inhibition of phaeomelanin.
 ayt = Recombinant fawn (expresses a varied phenotype depending on the breed) has been identified in numerous Tibetan Spaniels and individuals in other breeds, including the Dingo. Its hierarchical position is not yet understood.

Most texts suggest that the dominance hierarchy for the A locus alleles appears to be as follows: Ay > aw > at > a; however, research suggests the existence of pairwise dominance/recessiveness relationships in different families and not the existence of a single hierarchy in one family.

 Ay is incompletely dominant to at, so that heterozygous individuals have more black sabling, especially as puppies and Ayat can resemble the awaw phenotype. Other genes also affect how much black is in the coat.
 aw is the only allele present in many Nordic spitzes, and is not present in most other breeds.
 at includes tan point and saddle tan, both of which look tan point at birth. Modifier genes in saddle tan puppies cause a gradual reduction of the black area until the saddle tan pattern is achieved.
 a is only present in a handful of breeds. Most black dogs are black due to the K locus allele KB for dominant black.

Border Collies is one of the few breeds that lack agouti patterning, and only have sable and tan points. However, many border collies still test to have agouti genes.

E (extension) locus 
The alleles at the E locus (the melanocortin receptor one gene or MC1R) determine whether an animal expresses a melanistic mask, as well as determining whether an animal can produce eumelanin in its coat. There are three known, plus two more theorized, alleles that occur at the E locus:

 Em = Mask (a eumelanin mask is added to the face). The distribution of the pigments on the rest of the face and on the body is determined by the agouti locus.
 EG = Grizzle (if atat and not KB/-, tan underparts with a dark overlay covering the top and sides of the body, head and tail, and the outside of the limbs) - also called domino.
 Ed = Northern Domino (functions and appears similar to Grizzle in sighthounds) found mostly in Northern breeds such as the Siberian Husky and Finnish Lapphund, as well as Native breeds like the Chihuahua who are descended from primitive spitz breeds brought across the Bering Strait.
 E = Normal extension (pattern expressed as per alleles present at A and K loci).
 eh = Cocker sable (if KB/- and may require atat, tan with a dark overlay covering the top and sides of the body, head and tail, and the outside of the limbs).
 e = Recessive or clear fawn (tan, inhibition of eumelanin).
 e2 = Found only in the Australian Cattle Dog, this gene creates the cream color in this breed.
 e3 = Found only in Nordic breeds, this gene creates the white and yellow coat color.

The dominance hierarchy for the E locus alleles appears to be as follows: Em > EG/d > E > eh > e.
 E allows normal expression of eumelanin and/or phaeomelanin according to the alleles present at the A and K loci.
 Em allows similar pattern expression to E except any tan (phaeomelanin) areas on the mask area are replaced with eumelanin (black/etc.) The mask can vary from the muzzle, to the face and ears, to a larger area with shading on the front and sides as in the Belgian Tervuren. The mask Em is unaffected by the greying gene G and will remain dark in a G/- animal while the rest of the dog pales, such as in Kerry Blue Terriers. Some puppies are born with a mask which fades away within a few weeks of birth: these puppies do not have the Em allele and their temporary mask is due to sabling.
 An animal that is homozygous for e will express a red to yellow coat regardless of most alleles at other loci. Eumelanin is inhibited, so there can be no black hairs anywhere, even the whiskers. Pigment on the nose leather can be lost at the middle (Dudley nose). In combination with a/a (phaeomelanin inhibitor), an e/e dog will be white to off-white; in combination with U/U or U/u, an e/e dog will be off-white or cream.
 The Grizzle allele has been studied only in Salukis and Afghan Hounds, the latter in which it is referred to as "Domino", but also occurs in the Borzoi. Its placement in the dominance hierarchy has not been solidified. Black with fawn-tan points (at/at E/-) is instead dark-sable with extended clear-tan points (at/at EG/-). Brindle affects fawn and sable areas, resulting in black with bridled-tan points (at/at E/- Kbr/-) or brindle with clear-tan points (at/at EG/- Kbr/-). Expression of EG is dependent upon the animal being homozygous for at and not possessing Em or KB. EG is theorized to have no effect on the phenotype of non-at/- nor KB dogs and to be allelic to Em and e.
 Little information exists regarding the Ed allele. In behavior and appearance it almost mimics the Grizzle allele found in Sighthounds, however it is not the same mutation. Domino animals of this type will either have two copies of the mutation or have a single copy paired with e.
 The eh sable extension allele has been studied only in English Cocker Spaniels and produces sable in the presence of dominant black KB and tan point at/at. Its expression is dependent upon the animal not possessing Em nor E nor being homozygous for e. eh is theorized to be on the E locus and to have no effect on ky/ky dogs. All cocker spaniels are homozygous for at, so it is unknown how the gene may function in the presence of other A-series alleles.

K (dominant black) locus 
The alleles at the K locus (the β-Defensin 103 gene or DEFB103) determine the coloring pattern of an animal's coat. There are three known alleles that occur at the K locus:

KB = Dominant black (black)
kbr = Brindle (black stripes added to tan areas)
ky = Phaeomelanin permitted (pattern expressed as per alleles present at A and E loci)

The dominance hierarchy for the K locus alleles appears to be as follows: KB > kbr > ky.

KB causes a solid eumelanin coat (black, brown, grey or taupe) except when combined with e/e (tan or white), Eh/- (Cocker sable) or Em/- G/- and appropriate coat type (light eumelanin with dark eumelanin mask)
kbr causes the addition of eumelanin stripes to all tan areas of a dog except when combined with e/e (no effect) or EG/- atat non-KB/- (eumelanin and sabled areas become striped, tan areas remain tan)
ky is wild-type allowing full expression of other genes.

Interactions of some genes with brindle 
Alleles at the Agouti (A), Extension (E) and Black (K) loci determine the presence or absence of brindle and its location:

Patches and white spotting
The Merle (M), Harlequin (H), and Spotting (S) loci contribute to patching, spotting, and white markings. Alleles present at the Merle (M) and Harlequin (H) loci cause patchy reduction of melanin to half (merle), zero (harlequin) or both (double merle). Alleles present at the Spotting (S), Ticking (T) and Flecking (F) loci determine white markings.

H (harlequin) locus
DNA studies have isolated a missense mutation in the 20S proteasome β2 subunit at the H locus. The H locus is a modifier locus (of the M locus) and the alleles at the H locus will determine if an animal expresses a harlequin vs merle pattern. There are two alleles that occur at the H locus:
 H = Harlequin (if M/-, patches of full colour and white)
 h = Non-harlequin (if M/-, normal expression of merle)
H/h heterozygotes are harlequin and h/h homozygotes are non-harlequin. Breeding data suggests that homozygous H/H is embryonic lethal and that therefore all harlequins are H/h.
 The Harlequin allele is specific to Great Danes. Harlequin dogs (H/h M/m) have the same pattern of patches as merle (h/h M/m) dogs, but the patches are white and harlequin affects eumelanin and phaeomelanin equally. H has no effect on non-merle m/m dogs.

M (merle) locus

The alleles at the M locus (the silver locus protein homolog gene or SILV, aka premelanosome protein gene or PMEL) determine whether an animal expresses a merle pattern to its coat. There are two alleles that occur at the M locus:
 M = Merle (patches of full colour and reduced colour)
 m = Non-merle (normal expression)

M and m show a relationship of both co-dominance and no dominance.
 On heterozygous M/m merles, black is reduced to silver on ~50% of the animal in semi-random patches with rough edges like torn paper. The fraction of the dog covered by merle patches is random such that some animals may be predominantly black and others predominantly silver. The merle gene is “faulty” with many merle animals having one odd patch of a third shade of grey, brown or tan.
 On homozygous M/M “double merles”, black is replaced with ~25% black, ~50% silver and ~25% white, again with random variation, such that some animals have more black or more white.
 Eumelanin (black/etc.) is significantly reduced by M/m, but phaeomelanin is barely affected such that there will be little to no evidence of the merle gene on any tan areas or on an e/e dog. However, the white patches caused by M/M affect both pigments equally, such that a fawn double merle would be, on average, ~75% tan and ~25% white.
 The merle gene also affects the skin, eye colour, eyesight and development of the eye and inner ear. Merle M/m puppies develop their skin pigmentation (nose, paws, belly) with speckled-edged progression, equally evident in e/e merles except when extensive white markings cause pink skin to remain in these areas. Blue and part-blue eyes are common.
 Both heterozygosity and homozygosity of the merle gene (i.e., M/m and M/M) are linked to a range of auditory and ophthalmologic abnormalities. Most M/m merles have normal-sized eyes and acceptably functional eyesight and hearing; most M/M double merles suffer from microphthalmia and/or partial to complete deafness.

variation on merle allele 
There are other new discovery on M locus and it would be useful to add the supplementary category on "M(merle) Locus" part.
Since the original section only talk about just one allele M, but there are some variation on the one allele and derive a number of new alleles, which will lead to the other production of pigment.

 Cryptic merle (Mc and Mc+) 
One of the variation of M allele is Mc and Mc+. Although just one copy of Mc is not long enough to make visible change on coats, the combination of Mc or more than two copies of Mc would lead to odd shade of black/liver.

 Atypical merle (Ma and Ma+)
Another type of variation of M allele is Ma and Ma+. This kinds of allele would lead to visibly merle-patterned dog if there are two copies of Ma. It is important to be supplement because if the dog with atypical merle bred to dog with any longer merle allele, the double merle health problems might occur.

S (spotting) locus
The alleles at the S locus (the microphthalmia-associated transcription factor gene or MITF) determine the degree and distribution of white spotting on an animal's coat. There is disagreement as to the number of alleles that occur at the S locus, with researchers sometimes postulating a conservative two or, commonly, four alleles. The alleles postulated are:
 S = Solid color/no white (very small areas of white may still appear; a diamond or medallion on the chest, a few toe tips/toes, or a tail tip)
 si = Irish-spotting (white on muzzle, forehead, feet, legs, chest, neck and tail)
 sp = Piebald (varies from coloured with Irish spotting plus at least one white marking on the top or sides of the body or hips, to mostly white which generally retains patches of colour around the eyes, ears and tail base)
 sw = Extreme piebald spotting (extremely large areas of white, almost completely white)

In 2014, a study found that a combination of simple repeat polymorphism in the MITF-M Promoter and a SINE insertion is a key regulator of white spotting and that white color had been selected for by humans to differentiate dogs from their wild counterparts.

Based on this research the degree of White Spotting is dependent on the Promoter Length (Lp) to produce less or more color. A shorter Lp creates less white (Solid Colored and Residual White dogs) while a longer Lp creates more white (Irish Spotting and Piebald).

What separates Piebald from Irish White and Solid is the presence of a SINE insertion (Short Interspersed Element) in the S locus genes that changes the normal DNA production. The result is Piebald and Extreme Piebald. The only difference between the two recognized forms of Piebald is the length of the Lp.

Because of this variability, a dog's Phenotype will not always match their Genotype. The Beagle for example is fixed for spsp Piebald, yet there are Beagles with very little white on them, or Beagles that are mostly white. What makes them Piebald is the SINE Insertion, but the Lp length is what changes how their patterns are expressed.

 White spotting can cause blue eyes, microphthalmia, blindness and deafness; however, because pigmentation is generally retained around the eye/ear area, this is rare except in SINE White dogs (Piebald) which can sometimes lose pigment in those areas during fetal development.
 Some breeds like the Boston Terrier, Australian Shepherd, and Rough Collie have a naturally longer Lp and are considered "Fixed for White". This means even if they are genetically SS for Solid Color, they will still show White Spotting.

It is thought that the spotting that occurs in Dalmatians is the result of the interaction of three loci (the S locus, the T locus and F locus) giving them a unique spotting pattern not found in any other breed.

Albinism

C (colored) locus
People have postulated several alleles at the C locus and suggested some/all determine the degree to which an animal expresses phaeomelanin, a red-brown protein related to the production of melanin, in its coat and skin. Five alleles have been theorised to occur at the C locus:
 C = Full color (animal expresses phaeomelanin)
 cch = Chinchilla (partial inhibition of phaeomelanin resulting in decreased red pigment)
 ce = Extreme dilution (inhibition of phaeomelanin resulting in extremely reduced red pigment)
 cb, cp = Blue-eyed albino/Platinum (almost total inhibition of phaeomelanin resulting in near albino appearance)
 ca = Albino (complete inhibition of phaeomelanin production, resulting in complete inhibition of melanin production)

However, based on a 2014 publication about albinism in the Doberman Pinscher and later in other small breeds, the discovery was made that multiple alleles in the C locus are highly unlikely, and that all dogs are homozygous for Normal Color production, excluding dogs who carry albinism.

Theoretical genes for color and pattern
There are additional theoretical loci thought to be associated with coat color in dogs. DNA studies are yet to confirm the existence of these genes or alleles but their existence is theorised based on breeding data:

F (flecking) locus
The alleles at the theoretical F locus are thought to determine whether an animal displays small, isolated regions of white in otherwise pigmented regions (not apparent on white animals). Two alleles are theorised to occur at the F locus: 
 F = Flecked
 f = Not flecked
(See ticking below, which may be another name for the flecking described here)

It is thought that F is dominant to f.

G (progressive greying) locus
The alleles at the theoretical G locus are thought to determine if progressive greying of the animal's coat will occur. Two alleles are theorised to occur at the G locus:
 G = Progressive greying (melanin lost from hairs over time)
 g = No progressive greying

It is thought that G is dominant to g.
 The greying gene affects both eumelanin, and to a lesser extent phaeomelanin. In the presence of Em/- the eumelanin mask will be unaffected and remain dark. Grey dogs are born fully coloured and develop the greying effect over several months. New hairs are grown fully coloured but their colour fades over time towards white. Greying is most evident in continuous-growing coats (long + wire + curly) as individual hairs remain on the dog long enough for the colour to be lost. In short-haired dogs, hairs are shed out and re-grown before the colour has a chance to change.
 Premature greying, in which the face/etc. greys at a young age is not caused by G and has not been proven to be genetic.

T (ticking) locus
The alleles at the theoretical T locus are thought to determine whether an animal displays small, isolated regions of pigment in otherwise s-spotted white regions. Two alleles are theorised to occur at the T locus:
 T = Ticked
 t = Not ticked

It is thought that T is dominant to t. Ticking may be caused by several genes rather than just one. Patterns of medium-sized individual spots, smaller individual spots, and tiny spots that completely cover all white areas leaving a roan-like or merle-like appearance (reserving the term large spots for the variation exclusive to the Dalmatian) can each occur separately or in any combination.
 The effect of the ticking  is to add back little coloured spots to areas made white by piebald spotting (-/s) or the limited white markings of S/S animals. It does not affect white areas that were caused by a/a e/e or M/M or M/m H/h. The colour of the tick marks will be as expected or one shade darker. Tick marks are semi-random, so that they vary from one dog to the next and can overlap, but are generally present on the lower legs and heavily present on the nose.

U (urajiro) locus
The alleles at the theoretical U locus are thought to limit phaeomelanin production on the cheeks and underside. Two alleles are theorized to occur at the U locus:
 U = Urajiro
 u = Not urajiro

It is thought that U is recessive to u but due to lack of genetic studies these assumptions have only been made through visual assessment. The urajiro pattern is expressed in the tan (phaeomelanin) areas of any dog and does not effect black (eumelanin) pigment.

Miscolours in dog breeds
Miscolours occur quite rarely in dog breeds, because genetic carriers of the recessive alleles causing fur colours that don't correspond to the breed standard are very rare in the gene pool of a breed and there is an extremely low probability that one carrier will be mated with another. In case two carriers have offspring, according to the law of segregation an average of 25% of the puppies are homozygous and express the off-colour in the phenotype, 50% become carriers and 25% are homozygous for the standard colour. Usually off-coloured individuals are excluded from breeding, but that doesn't stop the inheritance of the recessive allele from carriers mated with standard-coloured dogs to new carriers.

In the breed Boxer large white markings in heterozygous carriers with genotype S si or S sw belong to the standard colours, therefore extreme white Boxers are born regularly, some of them with health problems. The cream-white colour of the Shiba Inu is not caused by any spotting gene but by strong dilution of pheomelanin. Melanocytes are present in the whole skin and in the embryonic tissue for the auditory organs and eyes, therefore this colour is not associated with any health issues.

 
The occurrence of a dominant coat colour gene not belonging to the standard colours is a suspicion for crossbreeding with another breed. For example the dilute gen D in the suddenly appeared variety "silver coloured" Labrador Retriever  might probably come from a Weimaraner. The same applies for Dobermann Pinschers suffering from Blue dog syndrome.

Somatic Mutations and Chimera 
Somatic mutation, a mutation that can occur in body cells after formation of the embryo, can be passed on to next generations. A pigment somatic mutation can cause patches of different colors (mosaicism) to appear in the dog's coat.

Genes associated with hair length, growth and texture

Every hair in the dog coat grows from a hair follicle, which has a three phase cycle, as in most other mammals. These phases are:
 anagen, growth of normal hair;
 catagen, growth slows, and hair shaft thins; and
 telogen, hair growth stops, the follicle rests, and the old hair falls off—is shed. At the end of the telogen phase, the follicle begins the cycle again.

Most dogs have a double coat, each hair follicle containing 1-2 primary hairs and several secondary hairs. The primary hairs are longer, thicker and stiffer, and called guard hairs or outer coat. Each follicle also holds a variety of silky- to wiry-textured secondary hairs (undercoat) all of which are wavy, and smaller and softer than the primary hair. The ratio of primary to secondary hairs varies at least six-fold, and varies between dogs according to coat type, and on the same dog in accordance with seasonal and other hormonal influences. Puppies are born with a single coat, with more hair follicles per unit area, but each hair follicle contains only a single hair of fine, silky texture. Development of the adult coat begins around 3 months of age, and is completed around 12 months.

Research indicates that the majority of variation in coat growth pattern, length and curl can be attributed to mutations in four genes, the R-spondin-2 gene or RSPO2, the fibroblast growth factor-5 gene or FGF5, the keratin-71 gene or KRT71 and the melanocortin 5 receptor gene (MC5R).
The wild-type coat in dogs is short, double and straight.

L (length) locus
The alleles at the L locus (the fibroblast growth factor-5 gene or FGF5) determine the length of the animal's coat. There are two known alleles that occur at the L locus:
 L = Short coat
 l = Long coat

L is dominant to l. A long coat is demonstrated when a dog has pair of recessive l alleles at this locus.
The dominance of L > l is incomplete, and L/l dogs have a small but noticeable increase in length and finer texture than closely related L/L individuals. However, between breeds there is significant overlap between the shortest L/L and the longest L/l phenotypes. In certain breeds (German Shepherd, Alaskan Malamute, Cardigan Welsh Corgi), the coat is often of medium length and many dogs of these breeds are also heterozygous at the L locus (L/l).

W (wired) locus

The alleles at the W locus (the R-spondin-2 gene or RSPO2) determine the coarseness and the presence of "facial furnishings" (e.g. beard, moustache, eyebrows). There are two known alleles that occur at the W locus:
 W = Wire (hair is coarse and facial furnishings present)
 w = Non-wire (hair is not coarse and facial furnishings are not present)

W is dominant to w, but the dominance of W > w is incomplete. W/W dogs have coarse hair, prominent furnishings and greatly-reduced shedding. W/w dogs have the harsh wire texture, but decreased furnishings, and overall coat length and shedding similar to non-wire animals.

Animals that are homozygous for long coat (i.e., l/l) and possess at least one copy of W will have long, soft coats with furnishings, rather than wirey coats.

R (curl) locus
 
The R (curl) Locus
The alleles at the R locus (the keratin-71 gene or KRT71) determine whether an animal's coat is straight or curly. There are two known alleles that occur at the R locus:
 R = Straight
 r = Curly

The relationship of R to r is one of no dominance. Heterozygotes (R/r) have wavy hair that is easily distinguishable from either homozygote. Wavy hair is considered desirable in several breeds, but because it is heterozygous, these breeds do not breed true for coat type.

Corded coats, like those of the Puli and Komondor are thought to be the result of continuously growing curly coats (long + wire + curly) with double coats, though the genetic code of corded dogs has not yet been studied. Corded coats will form naturally, but can be messy and uneven if not "groomed to cord" while the puppy's coat is lengthening.

Interaction of length and texture genes
These three genes responsible for the length and texture of an animal's coat interact to produce eight different (homozygous) phenotypes:

Breed exceptions to coat type
Breeds in which coat type Is not explained by FgF5, RSPO2 and KRT71 genes:
 Yorkshire Terrier, Silky Terrier
 Afghan Hound
Genotypes of dogs of these 3 breeds are usually L/L or L/l, which does not match with their long-haired phenotype. The Yorkshire and Silky Terriers share common ancestry and likely share an unidentified gene responsible for their long hair. The Afghan Hound has a unique patterned coat that is long with short patches on the chest, face, back and tail. The Irish Water Spaniel may share the same pattern gene, although unlike the Afghan Hound, the IWS is otherwise genetically a long-haired (fixed for l/l) breed.

Other related genes

Hairlessness gene
Some breeds of dog do not grow hair on parts of their bodies and may be referred to as hairless. Examples of hairless dogs are the Xoloitzcuintli (Mexican Hairless Dog), the Peruvian Inca Orchid (Peruvian Hairless Dog) and the Chinese Crested. Research suggests that hairlessness is caused by a dominant allele of the forkhead box transcription factor (FOXI3) gene, which is homozygous lethal. There are coated homozygous dogs in all hairless breeds, because this type of inheritance prevents the coat type from breeding true. The hairlessness gene permits hair growth on the head, legs and tail. Hair is sparse on the body, but present and typically enhanced by shaving, at least in the Chinese Crested, whose coat type is shaggy (long + wire). Teeth can be affected as well, and hairless dogs have sometimes incomplete dentition. It is one of the things which become better the last years, as it is common to select healthy dogs with good teeth for breeding.

The American Hairless Terrier is unrelated to the other hairless breeds and displays a different hairlessness gene. Unlike the other hairless breeds, the AHT is born fully coated, and loses its hair within a few months. The AHT gene, serum/glucocorticoid regulated kinase family member 3 gene (SGK3), is recessive and does not result in missing teeth. Because the breed is new and rare, outcrossing to the parent breed (the Rat Terrier) is permitted to increase genetic diversity. These crosses are fully coated and heterozygous for AHT-hairlessness.

Ridgeback
Some breeds (e.g., Rhodesian Ridgeback, Thai Ridgeback) have an area of hair along the spine between the withers and hips that leans in the opposite direction (cranially) to the surrounding coat. The ridge is caused by a duplication of several genes (FGF3, FGF4, FGF 19, ORAOV1 and sometimes SNP), and ridge is dominant to non-ridged.

Long Hair 
There are many genes and alleles that cause long hair in dogs, but most of these genes are recessive. This means that longhaired hybrid breeds usually have to have two longhair or longhair carrier parents, and the gene can also be passed on for many generations without being expressed.

Wire Hair 
There are lots of variations of allele that would affect the dog's hair. The allele that causes bristles is actually dominant. Dogs with both the longhair and line coat genes will be "coarse," which means longer line coats of fur. Examples of such coats include the Korthals Griffon, and possibly the Irish Wolfhound.

Nose colours 
The most common colour of dog nose is black. However, a number of genes can affect nose colour.
A blue dog nose is genetically impossible. But greyhounds without the blue dilution gene are sometimes found. Therefore, a dog that appears to be "blue" may have a black nose and black eyes because it is actually a black dog with the gray gene, not a proper blue diluent. Sometimes the blues can also be so dark that their coats and noses look almost black. It's hard to tell if these dogs are black or blue.
A "butterfly" nose is a bright pink patch lacking pigment on the skin of a dog's nose. The patches are randomly positioned and can cover any number of noses, from a tiny pink blob to almost the entire nose. Butterfly noses are sometimes seen on dogs with extreme white spotted patterns, but usually they are associated with meteorite coloration. The meteorite gene diluted the random portion of pigment in the hair and nose, forming gray areas in the hair and pink areas in the nose. Liver and Isabella's nose are usually very light, sometimes completely pink or bright pink, so the butterfly nose may not appear in the liver or Isabella meteorite color.
"Dudley nose" is a dog with a loss of pigment on its nose. Typically, the pigment loss on Dali's nose is in the middle and spreads outward, covering almost the entire nose of some dogs. Dudley's nose will never completely lose its pigment, nor will it be as bright pink as a butterfly's or even a liver dog's. Dudley noses are common in blacknosed dogs and are particularly associated with the recessive red gene.

Eye Colours
The genes also affect the eye colours of dogs. There are two main types of eye colours patterns.

Amber eyes 
All hepatic dogs (bb) have amber eyes. Amber eyes vary from light brown to yellow, chartreuse, or gray. Dogs with melanin can occasionally see amber eyes.[article refers to Dr Sheila M. Schmutz]

Blue eyes 
Blue eyes in dogs are often related to pigment loss in coatings.

The merle gene results in a bluish iris, and merle dogs often have blue, walled, or split eyes due to random pigment loss. Some genetic variants cause Heterochromia iridum.
The second way blue eyes can appear is when a dog has a lot of white fur on the face. Since the white areas cannot produce any pigment, pigment from the eyes and nose may be lost as well.
The third way is when dogs are affected by albinism.
A different gene, unaffected by coat color, can make the eyes blue. However, this gene is rare. It occurs occasionally in Border Collies and similar breeds, but is mostly seen in Siberian Huskies, which may have one or both eyes blue, regardless of their predominant coat color.

Genetic testing and phenotype prediction
In recent years genetic testing for the alleles of some genes has become available. Software is also available to assist breeders in determining the likely outcome of matings.

Characteristics linked to coat colour
The genes responsible for the determination of coat colour also affect other melanin-dependent development, including skin colour, eye colour, eyesight, eye formation and hearing. In most cases, eye colour is directly related to coat colour, but blue eyes in the Siberian Husky and related breeds, and copper eyes in some herding dogs are not known to be related to coat colour.

The development of coat colour, skin colour, iris colour, pigmentation in back of eye and melanin-containing cellular elements of the auditory system occur independently, as does development of each element on the left vs right side of the animal. This means that in semi-random genes (M merle, s spotting and T ticking), the expression of each element is independent. For example, skin spots on a piebald-spotted dog will not match up with the spots in the dog's coat; and a merle dog with one blue eye can just as likely have better eyesight in its blue eye than in its brown eye.

Loci for coat colour, type and length
All known genes are on separate chromosomes, and therefore no gene linkage has yet been described among coat genes. However, they do share chromosomes with other major conformational genes, and in at least one case, breeding records have shown an indication of genes passed on together.

There are size genes on all 39 chromosomes, 17 classified as "major" genes. 7 of those are identified as being of key importance and each results in ~2x difference in body weight. IGF1 (Insulin-like growth factor 1), SMAD2 (Mothers against decapentaplegic homolog 2), STC2 (Stanniocalcin-2) and GHR(1) (Growth hormone receptor one) are dose-dependent with compact dwarfs vs leaner large dogs and heterozygotes of intermediate size and shape. IGF1R (Insulin-like growth factor 1 receptor) and HMGA2 (High-mobility group AT-hook 2) are incomplete dominant with delicate dwarfs vs compact large dogs and heterozygotes closer to the homozygous dwarfed phenotypes. GHR(2) (Growth hormone receptor two) is completely dominant, homozygous and heterozygous dwarfs equally small, larger dogs with a broader flatter skull and larger muzzle. It is believed that the PMEL/SILV merle gene is linked to the HMGA2 size gene, meaning that alleles are most often inherited together, accounting for size differences in merle vs non-merle litter mates, such as in the Chihuahua and the Great Dane (merles usually larger) and Shetland Sheepdog (merles frequently smaller).

See also
 Labrador Retriever coat colour genetics
 Cat coat genetics
 Equine coat color genetics
 Farm-Fox Experiment

Notes

References

External links

Dog anatomy
Animal hair
Animal coat colors